AMC Networks Inc. is an American entertainment company headquartered in 11 Penn Plaza, New York.

AMC Networks owns and operates the eponymous cable channel and its siblings, IFC, We TV, and Sundance TV; the art house movie theater IFC Center in New York City; the independent film companies IFC Films and RLJE Films; the anime licensor Sentai Filmworks; the premium subscription streaming services AMC+, IFC Films Unlimited, Acorn TV, Allblk, Shudder, Sundance Now and Hidive; and a minority interest in leading Canadian production studio Shaftesbury Films.

The company operates in Europe & Latin America through its international division, AMC Networks International. Through joint ventures with BBC Studios, the company manages BBC America and BBC World News cable channels in the US. Due to this relationship, AMC Networks additionally maintains a minority share in the US operations of the British-TV streaming service BritBox, a joint venture between the BBC and ITV plc.

Formerly known as Rainbow Media Holdings, LLC (or alternately Rainbow Programming Holdings), the company was founded in 1980 as a subsidiary of Cablevision. It became a publicly traded company in July 2011. The company is majority-owned and controlled by the Dolan family.

History

As "Rainbow Media"
When Rainbow Programing Services was formed in mid-1980, it originally was a joint-venture of four cable television companies: Cablevision, Comcast, Cox Communications, and Daniels & Associates. The first service to come out of the partnership was launched on December 8, 1980. The hybrid service, which broadcast nightly on satellite time subleased from the National Christian Network featured culture events network Bravo on Sunday and Monday nights and adult-oriented B movie network Escapade the rest of the week. Due to the involvement of the four cable companies, the new service quickly gained subscribers. By July 1981, both channels expanded their offerings to seven nights a week. In August 1981, Playboy Enterprises became half-owner of Escapade which introduced a new programming block to the channel in early 1982. By the end of that year the network would relaunch as The Playboy Channel.

In the years that followed, the three other cable companies would exit the partnership, leaving Cablevision as the sole owner of Rainbow by 1983. Cablevision transferred control of its previously launched regional sports network SportsChannel New York to Rainbow. In 1983, three other regional sports networks were acquired: PRISM New England (soon to be relaunched as SportsChannel New England), Philadelphia-based PRISM, and Chicago-based SportsVision. Playboy also bought out Rainbow's share in The Playboy Channel, although it would continue to market the channel for the next few years.

In 1984, Rainbow added another new network to its portfolio, American Movie Classics (AMC) which initially featured "classic" pre-1970 movies. Cablevision began packaging AMC and Bravo together as the Rainbow Service. Near the end of 1984, CBS and Cablevision announced a deal to have CBS take 50% ownership in the Rainbow Service and Rainbow's marketing. The agreement also gave CBS partial ownership in the regional sports properties which had already become a joint venture with The Washington Post (the Post did not have ownership in Bravo or AMC). In 1986, Tele-Communications Inc. purchased a stake in AMC. Through this deal, the network which had 300,000 subscribers was able to greatly expand carriage to most of TCI's 3.9 million subscribers. Long Island cable news service News 12 was also launched in 1986.

CBS and Cablevision parted ways in 1987. In 1988, Rainbow's SportsChannel would make its largest programing deal, gaining national television rights for the National Hockey League. Cablevision gained a new partner that year, NBC, which obtained 50% ownership in Rainbow. Through this partnership, five additional regional sports networks were created in the Bay Area, Cincinnati, Cleveland, Philadelphia, and Los Angeles. The partnership also produced the Olympics Triplecast, a pay-per-view service providing additional coverage of the 1992 Summer Olympics.

1994 saw the launch of an American feed of the Canadian music channel MuchMusic USA, in partnership with CHUM Limited (who would launch a Canadian version of Bravo the year after), and the Independent Film Channel.
. Years later would CHUM sell their stake to Rainbow in 2000 and revoked their license for the MuchMusic name, which culminated into a rebrand as Fuse in 2003. Fuse became a part of MSG Media in 2010, and has since been spun off as Fuse Media.

In 1997, Romance Classics (later WE), a channel that had been in planning for over five year and had its launch date pushed back multiple times was finally launched. But Rainbow's largest venture that year was the merger of SportsChannel into Fox Sports Net. Rainbow retained varying ownership interests in all of the former SportsChannel networks except PRISM and SportsChannel Philadelphia, which were both shut down to make way for the first Comcast SportsNet. Over the next decade, all of these networks except SportsChannel NY (then Fox Sports New York) were gradually sold off. Fox Sports New York was then transferred to the MSG Media division and rebranded MSG+.

Rainbow ran the local-minded MSG Metro Channels which launched in 1998, before folding them in late 2005.

Through a series of transactions, beginning in 1997, NBC's stake was eventually reduced. In 2002, Cablevision sold its share of Bravo to NBC and as part of the deal, NBC gave up its then 20% share in Rainbow.

2003 saw Rainbow DBS Company launch a DBS satellite service, the HDTV-oriented Voom. The service ceased operations on April 30, 2005, and instead several of Voom's HD channels were launched on Dish Network and Cablevision, now bannered as Voom HD Networks. The networks were discontinued in 2009.

In 2005, Cablevision considered spinning off its content subsidiary Rainbow Media as a publicly traded company, and making their core cable business private, but withdrew the plan. In 2006, a new plan emerged to privatize all of Cablevision, including Rainbow Media. In January 2007, with no word on if the privatization would go through, Liberty Media expressed interest in acquiring Rainbow Media from Cablevision.
In June 2008, Rainbow acquired the Sundance Channel from NBCUniversal, CBS, and Robert Redford. Rainbow Media also owned Wedding Central which was shut down the same day AMC Networks went public.

As "AMC Networks"

2011–2020
On March 10, 2011, Cablevision, as approved by its board on December 16, 2010, announced that Rainbow Media would be spun off as a publicly traded company, AMC Networks, later in 2011, and, as said in 2005, making their core cable business private. Rainbow Media's former President Josh Sapan serves as the president and chief executive of AMC Networks which went public on July 1, 2011.

On May 4, 2012, Dish Network announced that it would no longer carry the AMC Networks family of cable channels upon the expiration of the satellite provider's distribution agreement with the company at the end of June 2012, citing that AMC Networks charged an excessive amount in retransmission consent payments from the service for their carriage and low audience viewership for the channels.

AMC Networks responded to Dish Network's announcement of its pending removal of the channels as being related to a 2008 breach of contract lawsuit against Dish Network by the company's former Voom HD Networks subsidiary (under the company's previous Rainbow Media Holdings brand) (which is pending trial in the New York State Supreme Court), in which it is seeking more than $2.5 billion in damages against Dish Network for improperly terminating its carriage contract; Voom's high-definition channels were carried on the provider from May 1, 2005, until May 12, 2008, when Dish removed ten of Voom's fifteen channels from its lineup and the five remaining channels the following day. Dish Network stated that the lawsuit is unrelated to the decision to remove the AMC Networks channels and that it ended the carriage agreement on its own terms.

On May 20, 2012, Dish Network removed Sundance Channel from its channel lineup. Two weeks later on June 4, 2012, Dish relocated AMC, WEtv, and IFC to higher channel positions with AMC being split into two separate standard definition and high definition channel feeds (AMC moved from channel 130 to channel 9609 for the SD feed and 9610 for the HD feed, WEtv moved from channel 128 to channel 9608 and IFC was moved from channel 393 to channel 9607); the former channel lineup spaces occupied by the three channels were respectively replaced with HDNet, Style and MoviePlex multiplex channel Indieplex. The move is believed to be in response to an ad run during a June 3 airing of an episode of Mad Men urging Dish Network customers to inform the company to keep the three AMC Networks channels on the satellite provider, with Dish Network stating that the relocated channel positions better reflect the channels' ratings.

On July 1, 2012, Dish Network dropped AMC, WEtv, and IFC from the channel line-up altogether.

On July 12, 2012, AMC said in an e-mailed statement that it would stream over the Internet the season premiere of Breaking Bad to Dish customers. "Dish subscribers can register online starting July 13 for the show, which airs on July 15. We want to give Dish customers an extra week to switch providers so they can enjoy the rest of the season."

On October 21, 2012, AMC Networks announced a settlement was reached between them, Cablevision and Dish in which Dish was forced to pay up to $700 million in damages to Cablevision for damages from removing Voom owned channels off the Dish lineup back in 2008, and in return Dish signed a new agreement to bring the AMC Networks owned channels back on the Dish lineup with AMC returning October 21 and the rest on November 1.

From 2013 to 2015, the company acquired or joined a joint venture each year. On October 28, 2013, AMC Networks announced it would acquire most of Chellomedia, sans Chello Benelux, an international operator of cable networks, from Liberty Global for around $1.04 billion. On October 23, 2014, AMC confirmed it had purchased a 49.9% stake in BBC America, with BBC Studios retaining the remaining share of the network. In 2015, AMC Networks, along with Upfront Ventures, Daher Capital, Northgate Ventures, invested a round of funding in the Latin YouTube network MiTú.

In 2016, AMC Networks finalized a partnership agreement with former BET founder Robert L. Johnsons RLJ Company. According to the agreement, AMC will use its programming and distribution clout to benefit Acorn and UMC. Additionally, the RLJ-AMC partnership will allow for greater investment in content from African-American creatives, Johnson emphasized. The agreement called for AMC to provide RLJ with a $60 million loan on a seven-year term and $5 million on a one-year term. AMC has received warrants to purchase at least 20 million shares or the equivalent of 50.1% of the company. The time frame for exercising those warrants is open-ended, AMC said.

On November 15, 2016, AMC acquired a minority stake in comedy video website and film and television production company Funny or Die, with plans to integrate it with IFC.

On April 27, 2018, the company, as the owner of IFC, acquired a majority stake in comedy venue operator Levity Live.

On July 30, 2018, AMC Networks reached a definitive agreement to acquire RLJ Entertainment where AMC would pay $59 million for the remaining RLJE shares not owned by AMC or Robert L. Johnson. The transaction was approved by RLJ Entertainment's stockholders on October 31, and AMC Networks completed the acquisition on November 1. RLJ Entertainment became a privately owned subsidiary of AMC Networks, with Johnson and his affiliates owning a 17% stake.

In 2019, AMC Networks and the New Zealand public broadcaster TVNZ entered into an agreement to jointly produce The Dead Lands, a Māori–theme supernatural series set in pre-contact New Zealand. The series was distributed by AMC's streaming service Shudder in the US, Canada, UK, and Ireland and by TVNZ On Demand in New Zealand.

2020–present
In early 2020, the AMC Networks involved Switzer Group to lead the redesign of its tenth-floor headquarters at 11 Penn Plaza, New York.

On May 13, 2020, AMC Networks announced it was acquiring the rights to Anne Rice's major literary works, including The Vampire Chronicles and Lives of the Mayfair Witches.

In September 2020, executive chairman Charles Dolan retired from his position, moving to a chairman emeritus role. His son, James L. Dolan, was then named chairman of AMC Networks.

On February 2, 2021, AMC Networks entered into a strategic partnership with Canadian production company Shaftesbury Films. AMC made an investment in the company, thus giving them access to the latter's slate and expanding their content and development capabilities in Canada.

On January 5, 2022, AMC Networks acquired Japanese anime company Sentai Holdings, including distributor Sentai Filmworks, and streaming service HIDIVE.

On March 1, 2022, AMC Networks announced the launch of AMC Networks Publishing, their new book publishing arm.

Units

Television channels 
 AMC
 IFC
 Sundance TV
 We TV
 BBC America
 Voom HD Networks

Streaming services 
 Acorn TV
 Allblk
 AMC+
 BritBox (minority stake)
 HIDIVE
 IFC Films Unlimited
 Shudder
 Sundance Now
 WE tv+

Other assets 
 MiTú (investment)
 Levity Live (majority stake)
 Shaftesbury Films (minority stake) 
 Sentai Filmworks
Anime Network
 AMC Networks Publishing

AMC Networks International 

On October 28, 2013, AMC Networks announced it would acquire most of Chellomedia, an international operator of cable networks, from Liberty Global for around $1.04 billion. The acquisition did not include Chello Benelux, owners of Film1 and Sport1. On February 2, 2014, the transaction was completed. What was formerly Chellomedia is now known as AMC Networks International and will allow AMC Networks to distribute its programming worldwide.

BBC America joint venture 

On October 23, 2014, AMC confirmed it had purchased a 49.9% stake in BBC America, with BBC Studios retaining the remaining share of the network. The joint venture will also give AMC, which itself distributes the BBC World News channel in the United States, operational control in BBC America, which will be managed as a stand-alone from AMC's other channels.

Former assets 
Bravo acquired by NBC in 2002 for $1.25 billion.
 Funny or Die
MuchMusic USA with CHUM Limited; became Fuse on May 19, 2003; spun off as a part of The Madison Square Garden Company in 2010; spun off as part of spun off further in 2014 as Fuse Media, LLC.
News 12 Networks
Escapade/The Playboy Channel
SportsChannel (joint-venture, later Fox Sports Networks/Bally Sports)
Wedding Central shuttered July 1, 2011; programming moved to WE tv, and website redirects to WE tv's weddings section.

References

External links 
 
 

 
Cable network groups in the United States
Entertainment companies based in New York City
Companies based in Nassau County, New York
American companies established in 1980
Entertainment companies established in 1980
Mass media companies established in 1980
Companies listed on the Nasdaq
SportsChannel
Sentai Filmworks
1980 establishments in New York (state)
Corporate spin-offs
Mass media companies of the United States